Christian Hock (born 11 April 1970) is a German former professional football player, coach, and manager.

References

External links
 

1970 births
Living people
German footballers
Association football midfielders
Borussia Mönchengladbach players
Borussia Mönchengladbach II players
1. FSV Mainz 05 players
Kickers Offenbach players
Viktoria Aschaffenburg players
Bundesliga players
2. Bundesliga players
German football managers
SV Wehen Wiesbaden managers
KSV Hessen Kassel managers
Rot Weiss Ahlen managers
FC 08 Homburg managers
2. Bundesliga managers
3. Liga managers
People from Aschaffenburg
Sportspeople from Lower Franconia
Footballers from Bavaria